Dundee Parish Church (St Mary’s) is located in the east section of Dundee's "City Churches", the other being occupied by the Steeple Church. Both are congregations in the Church of Scotland, although with differing styles of worship. 

Dundee played an important role in the Reformation, and John Knox asserts in his History of the Reformation that "the first face of a public church Reformed" was that of St Mary's in Dundee, by 1556.

The church dates back to 1190, when it was founded by David, Earl of Huntingdon, brother of William the Lion, King of Scots. The original buildings have not survived. In 1303 the church was burnt by an invading English army. Following a further invasion in 1547 the church was burnt down again.  In the late Middle Ages, Dundee's was the largest parish church in Scotland with the Old Steeple, built in the 1470s during the Provostship of George Spalding, the tallest tower.

In 1841 three of the City Churches were again destroyed by fire. Two were rebuilt, the South Church or St Paul's and the East Church or St Mary's. St Mary's, now known as Dundee Parish Church (St Mary's) was rebuilt being completed in 1844 to the design of William Burn.  In 1847 the rebuilt South Church was reopened under the name St Paul's (South) Church.

The Old Steeple dates back to the 1480s. Between 1782 and 1841 there were no fewer than four Church of Scotland congregations occupying the City Churches under one roof but with separate sanctuaries. After the post 1841 rebuilding there were three congregations, then two since the 1980s – namely Dundee Parish Church (St Mary’s) and the Steeple Church.

Several past ministers have served as Moderators of the General Assembly of the Church of Scotland, most recently the late Very Reverend Dr William B. R. Macmillan in 1991.

Ministers from the Reformation to 1690
St Mary's was the sole parish church for Dundee until 1834. Before this several congregations met within different parts of St Marys. A second congregation, the Second Charge, was founded in 1590. A Third Charge was added in 1609. Therefore from the period 1609-1690 there were three clergyman simultaneously deemed minister of Dundee, all leading their congregations within the one church. The church was divided into sections for the different congregations to meet.

First Charge:
 Paul Methven 1558–1560
 William Christison 1560–1597 Moderator in 1569
 Robert Howie 1598–1605
 David Lindsay, MA 1606–1634
 Andrew Collace, MA 1635–1639
 Andrew Auchinleck, MA 1642–1663
 Henry Scrymgeour, MA 1664–1690

Second Charge (Also known as South Church, though this part of St Mary's was destroyed in a fire in 1645):

 James Robertson 1588–1623
 John Duncanson, MA 1624–1651
 George Martin, MA 1658–1660
 Alexander Mylne 1661–1665
 John Guthrie, MA 1667–1685
 Robert Norie, MA 1686–1689
 George Anderson, MA 1690–1690

Third Charge (This congregation became St Paul's parish in 1834):

 William Wedderburn, MA 1611–1616
 Colin Campbell, MA 1617–1638
 John Robertson, MA 1641–1662
 William Rait 1662–1679
 Robert Rait 1682–1689

Ministers since 1690
In 1690, following the Glorious Revolution the Church of Scotland permanently switched to Presbyterian Government. The incumbent minister of the Parish of  Dundee, Henry Scrymgeour demitted office in 1690 and the charge was declared vacant in 1694.  The charge was not filled until 1699.

Since that time the following have served as minister of the charge:

Samuel Johnstone MA 1699–1731
Thomas Davidson 1732–1760
Robert Small DD 1761–1808
Archibald McLachlan DD 1808–1848
Charles Adie DD 1848–1861
Archibald Watson MA DD 1862–1881 Moderator in 1880 (died in office)
Colin Campbell MA BD DD 1882–1905
William L. Wilson MA 1905–1911
Adam W. Fergusson MA BD 1911–1933
Alfred Ernest Warr BD 1933–1936
John Henry Duncan MA BPhil DD 1937–1951
Hugh O. Douglas MA DD LLD KVCO CBE 1951–1977
William B. R. MacMillan MA BD LLD DD 1978–1993
Keith F. Hall MA BD 1994–present

Memorials
The church includes a memorial to the soldiers of the 4th (City of Dundee) Battalion & 4/5th (Angus & Dundee) Battalion, the Black Watch, who died during the First World War. A new memorial and roll of honour to commemorate over 600 local seamen and women who died during the Great War was placed in the church in 2017. The memorial was unveiled by Her Royal Highness Anne, Princess Royal during a special service held in the church on 10 July 2017.

See also
List of Church of Scotland parishes

References

External links
Dundee Parish Church (St Mary’s)

Church of Scotland churches in Scotland
Churches in Dundee
Category A listed buildings in Dundee
Churches completed in 1844
Protestant churches converted from Roman Catholicism
Rebuilt churches in the United Kingdom
19th-century Church of Scotland church buildings
Listed churches in Scotland